Dame Rosemary Anne Horton  (née Moon; born 25 March 1940) is a New Zealand philanthropist. Over a period of more than 40 years she has raised money for New Zealand organisations, many of which focus on sick children and women.

Biography 
Horton was born in Christchurch on 25 March 1940 to Olga (known as Bill) and Ellis Moon and grew up in Ashburton. Her mother died of breast cancer in February 1963, when Horton was almost 23.

In her late 20s, Horton worked in the library at UEB, a large corporate business in Auckland.

Horton was a founding trustee of the Starship Foundation and Friends of Starship in Auckland. She was also the founding chair of the New Zealand Breast Cancer Foundation, and has contributed to Women's Refuge, the SPCA and the Salvation Army.

In 2014 Horton and her husband established the Michael and Dame Rosie Horton Prize at the University of Auckland to remember New Zealand journalist and writer, Marcia Russell.

Horton and her husband have a second home in Australia and have collected over 300 pieces of contemporary Aboriginal art. The collection will be donated to the Art Gallery of New South Wales in Sydney.

Personal life 
Horton is married to Michael Horton, her second husband. He was the managing director of newspaper and magazine publisher Wilson & Horton until 1995.

Honours and awards
In 1990, Horton received the New Zealand 1990 Commemoration Medal. In the 1993 Queen's Birthday Honours, she was awarded the Queen's Service Medal for community service. In the 2004 Queen's Birthday Honours, she was appointed a Companion of the Queen's Service Order for community service. In the 2011 Queen's Birthday Honours, she was made a Dame Companion of the New Zealand Order of Merit, for services to philanthropy.

References

1940 births
Living people
Recipients of the Queen's Service Medal
Companions of the Queen's Service Order
Dames Companion of the New Zealand Order of Merit
New Zealand philanthropists
People from Christchurch
People from Ashburton, New Zealand